Bonnal can refer to:

 Bonnal, Luxembourg
 Bonnal, Doubs, France
 Joseph-Ermend Bonnal